The You're Only Young Once... EP was the only release from the hardcore punk band Side by Side.  It was released as Revelation Records number 5 in 1988.  Nine years later, it was rereleased as a 22-song LP.  The Revelation 5b LP release was meant to combat a popular bootleg with much of the same material.

The total pressing of the EP was just over six thousand black vinyl copies, in three equal pressings, with 17 extra in the first pressing.  The LP had only one pressing of 1109 black vinyl and 100 blue vinyl, although it is still in print on CD.

The silhouettes posing on the cover are a take off of LL Cool J's poses on the back cover of his LP, "Radio."

EP Track listing
(all songs written by Side By Side)
 "Backfire"
 "My Life To Live"
 "Living A Lie"
 "Look Back"
 "You're Only Young Once"
 "Friends"
 "Side By Side"

LP Track listing
(all songs written by Side By Side, except "Fuck Your Attitude," by Warzone and "Sick Of Things The Way They Are" by Youth Brigade)

Side A.

 "Back Fire"
 "My Life To Live"
 "Living A Lie"
 "Look Back"
 "You're Only Young Once"
 "Friends"
 "Side By Side"
 "Dead Serious"
 "The Time Is Now"
 "Living A Lie"

Side B.

 "Side By Side"
 "Violence To Fade"
 "You're Only Young Once"
 "My Life To Live"
 "Dead Serious"
 "So Fucking Blind"
 "Violence To Fade"
 "So Fucking Blind"
 "Fuck Your Attitude"
 "Good Clean Fun"
 "Sick Of Things The Way They Are"
 "Side By Side"

Recording details
 Jules Massey - vocals
 Eric Fink - Lead guitar 
 Alex Brown - Rhythm guitar
 Billy Bitter - bass guitar
 Sammy Siegler - drums
 Don Fury - producer

External links
Truetilldeath.com page

1988 debut EPs
Side by Side (band) albums
Albums produced by Don Fury